Glen Dale Johnson (September 11, 1911 – February 10, 1983), was a lawyer, a U.S. Democratic Party politician, and a member of the United States House of Representatives from Oklahoma for one term from 1947 to 1949.

Early life
Johnson was born in Melbourne, Arkansas (a small town located in Izard County) on September 11, 1911, son to Willie and Jeffie Johnson. In 1920, the family relocated to Paden, Oklahoma, where he attended the public schools. He graduated from the University of Oklahoma Law School at Norman in 1939; he was admitted to the bar the same year and began his law practice in Okemah.

Career
Johnson was elected to the Oklahoma House of Representatives in 1940 and re-elected in 1942. He resigned from the Oklahoma House in January, 1942 to enlist in the United States Army following the Japanese attack on Pearl Harbor and the U.S. entry into World War II. On one three-day pass, he married Imogene Storms in Okemah on December 5, 1942. While he entered the Army as a private, in May 1946 he was discharged as a captain.  Upon his return to Oklahoma, he resumed his practice of law.

Johnson ran for and was elected to Congress (from Oklahoma's 4th Congressional district) as a Democrat in 1946, defeating incumbent Lyle Boren in the primary election, and served from January 3, 1947, to January 3, 1949.   He considered running for re-election in 1948, but instead chose to run for the U.S. Senate.  After losing the Democratic nomination, he retired from Congress after serving only one term.

After leaving Congress, Johnson continued to work in the field of law. He was the neutral arbitrator for the National Mediation Board in 1949 and 1950.  He served as an attorney in the Office of the Solicitor for the U.S. Department of the Interior in Washington, D.C., from 1961 to 1967. He was the chairman of the Oil Import Appeals Board (representing the Department of the Interior) from 1967 to 1969. He served as the  attorney in the Solicitor's Office, Department of the Interior, assigned to the Muskogee, Oklahoma field office (from 1969 to 1972).  He relocated back to Okemah, Oklahoma, where he remained until his death.

Death and personal life
Johnson died of congestive heart failure in Okemah, Okfuskee County, Oklahoma, on February 10, 1983 (age 71 years, 152 days), and was buried at Highland Cemetery in Okemah.

Johnson and his wife Imogene had a son, Glen D. Johnson Jr., who served as Oklahoma's youngest Speaker of the House, then served in higher education—for ten years as president of Southeastern Oklahoma State University, then as chancellor of Oklahoma's state system of higher education. His death was just three weeks after his son was sworn in as a member of the Oklahoma House of Representatives.

See also
 Politics of Oklahoma
 Oklahoma Democratic Party
 Oklahoma Congressional Districts
 Lyle Boren
 Tom Steed
 Glen D. Johnson Jr.

References

External links
 Biography of Glen D. Johnson at Biographical Directory of the U.S. Congress
 Encyclopedia of Oklahoma History and Culture - Johnson, Glen

1911 births
1983 deaths
People from Izard County, Arkansas
People from Okfuskee County, Oklahoma
University of Oklahoma College of Law alumni
Oklahoma lawyers
Democratic Party members of the Oklahoma House of Representatives
United States Army officers
United States Army personnel of World War II
Democratic Party members of the United States House of Representatives from Oklahoma
People from Okemah, Oklahoma
20th-century American lawyers
20th-century American politicians